Rippon College is the oldest girls' school in Southern Province, Sri Lanka. The school was established in 1817 by the Rev. John McKenny as the female branch or department of the 2nd Wesleyan English School in Ja koratuwa, Megalle, Galle in 1817.Methodist missionaries at Richmond Hill, Galle. At the beginning the school was the Galle Girls' School. in 1857, the school was moved to Richmond Hill along with Galle School and several branch schools and was called the Richmond Hill Girls' Boarding school. In 1876, the Rev George Baugh separated it from the boys' school and renamed it as the  Whitfield Road School for Girls, and later it was again renamed in honour of the Rev. Joseph Rippon who founded the Richmond Hill circuit and  served as the Superintendent Missionary of Galle in Ceylon during the period of 1850 to 1860. The school presently provides primary and secondary education to girls aged 6 to 19 and has a student population of around 2,550.

History and origins
The first school for girls in Southern Province was established in 1817 by the Methodist Missionary Rev. John McKenny at Magalle on 1 December 1817 as  the female branch or department of the second Wesleyan English School in Ja Koratuwa, Circular Road, Magalle, Galle.  It was simply the female school of The Galle School (which was later upgraded as a high school and was renamed as Richmond College) in the beginning. The school was moved to Seymour's Hill in 1858 when The Galle School and several branch schools were relocated (by then known as Richmond Hill). The School was then called the Richmond Hill Girls' Boarding School in 1861, and in 1871 the school was separated from The Richmond Hill Boys' School (which was known as The Galle School since its inception in 1814). It was then renamed by the Rev. George Baugh as the Whitfield Road School for Girls, but later it was renamed in honour of the Rev. Joseph Rippon who purchased the Richmond Hill and served in Galle  as the Superintending  Missionary from 1850 to 1860. After the  Richmond College was upgraded as a High School, Rippon too was upgraded in 1876. Until Miss Eastwood came as the Principal in end May 1876, the Rev Samuel Langdon of Richmond and Mrs. Langdon looked after the school.

Past Principals
1871-
1876 -         Ms. Ellen Eastwood
1878 -          Ms.Tebb
1882  -        Ms. Wilkin
1889  -         Ms.Trigs
1893 -         Ms. Hartley
1896 -         Ms. Oliver
1897 -         Ms. Prince
1905  -        Ms. Tebb
1907  -        Ms. Ward
1910   -       Ms. Wightman
1914  -        Ms. Allen
1914  -        Ms. Bamford
1938  -        Ms. Williams
1943  -        P. C. R. Perera
1949  -        Lesly
1954  -        M. A. Perera
1958 -         W. Stembo
1966  -        D. W. Windsor Godawatta
1972  -        G. Daniel
1976  -        N. D. B. Senevirathne
1987 -         V. G. U. J. Gunasekara
1999  -        W. S. Ranasinghe
2003  -        K. D. S. Mangalika
2003  -        P. N. Rajapaksha
2010  -        K. N. Ashoka
2011  -        P. N. Rajapaksha
2014  -        Devika Sirisooriya
2014  -        M. S. R. Iranganie

Houses
The school houses are named after four past principals of the school.
Prince - 
Ward - 
Tebb- 
Wightman -

Alumni 
Nelka Shiromala

See also
 List of the oldest schools in Sri Lanka

References

External links 
Official Website of Rippon Girls' College

Educational institutions established in 1871
Former Methodist schools in Sri Lanka
Girls' schools in Sri Lanka
National schools in Sri Lanka
Schools in Galle
1871 establishments in Ceylon